Mohammad Rafikul Islam Khan (born 7 November 1977, in Rajshahi), generally known as Rafikul Khan, is a Bangladeshi cricketer who played a Test and ODI match for Bangladesh in 2002. He plays domestic first-class cricket for Rajshahi Division.

References

1977 births
Living people
Bangladesh Test cricketers
Bangladesh One Day International cricketers
Bangladeshi cricketers
Rajshahi Division cricketers
People from Rajshahi District